DNA annotation or genome annotation is the process of identifying the locations of genes and all of the coding regions in a genome and determining what those genes do. An annotation (irrespective of the context) is a note added by way of explanation or commentary. Once a genome is sequenced, it needs to be annotated to make sense of it. Genes in a eukaryotic genome can be annotated using various annotation tools such as FINDER. A modern annotation pipeline can support a user-friendly web interface and software containerization such as MOSGA. Modern annotation pipelines for prokaryotic genomes are Bakta, Prokka and PGAP.

For DNA annotation, a previously unknown sequence representation of genetic material is enriched with information relating genomic position to intron-exon boundaries, regulatory sequences, repeats, gene names and protein products. This annotation is stored in genomic databases such as Mouse Genome Informatics, FlyBase, and WormBase. Educational materials on some aspects of biological annotation from the 2006 Gene Ontology annotation camp and similar events are available at the Gene Ontology website.

The National Center for Biomedical Ontology develops tools for automated annotation of database records based on the textual descriptions of those records.

As a general method, dcGO has an automated procedure for statistically inferring associations between ontology terms and protein domains or combinations of domains from the existing gene/protein-level annotations.

Process
Genome annotation consists of three main steps:

 Identify portions of the genome that do not code for proteins.
 Identify elements on the genome, a process called gene prediction.
 Attach biological information to these elements.

Automatic annotation tools attempt to perform these steps via computer analysis, as opposed to manual annotation (a.k.a. curation) which involves human expertise. Ideally, these approaches co-exist and complement each other in the same annotation pipeline.

A simple method of gene annotation relies on homology based search tools, like BLAST, to search for homologous genes in specific databases; the resulting information is then used to annotate genes and genomes. However, as information is added to the annotation platform, manual annotators become capable of deconvoluting discrepancies between genes that are given the same annotation. Some databases use genome context information, similarity scores, experimental data, and integrations of other resources to provide genome annotations through their subsystems approach. Other databases (e.g. Ensembl) rely on curated data sources as well as a range of different software tools in their automated genome annotation pipeline.

There are two types of DNA annotation:

 Structural annotation consists of the identification of genomic elements. Finding the locations of ORFs, coding regions and regulatory motifs, as well as determining the gene structure, are examples of structural annotation.

 Functional annotation involves attaching biological information to genomic elements, by determining which biochemical and biological functions they have, the regulatory and interaction networks they participate in, and their expression.

These steps may involve both biological experiments and in silico analysis. Proteogenomics based approaches utilize information from expressed proteins, often derived from mass spectrometry, to improve genomic annotations.

A variety of software tools have been developed that allow scientists to view and share genome annotations, such as MAKER.

Genome annotation remains a major challenge for scientists investigating the human genome, now that the genome sequences of more than a thousand human individuals (the 100,000 Genomes Project) and several model organisms are largely complete. Identifying the locations of genes and other genetic control elements is often described as defining the biological "parts list" for the assembly and normal operation of an organism. Scientists are still at an early stage in the process of delineating this parts list and in understanding how all the parts "fit together".

Genome annotation is an active area of investigation and involves a number of different organizations in the life science community which publish the results of their efforts in publicly available biological databases accessible via the web and other electronic means. Here is an alphabetical listing of on-going projects relevant to genome annotation:

 Encyclopedia of DNA elements (ENCODE)
 Entrez Gene
 Ensembl
 GENCODE
 Gene Ontology Consortium
 GeneRIF
 RefSeq
 Uniprot
 Vertebrate and Genome Annotation Project (Vega)

At Wikipedia, genome annotation has started to become automated under the auspices of the Gene Wiki portal which operates a bot that harvests gene data from research databases and creates gene stubs on that basis.

References

DNA